Evolver is a software package that allows users to solve a wide variety of optimization problems using a genetic algorithm. Launched in 1989, it was the first commercially available genetic algorithm package for personal computers, and is part of the permanent collection at the Computer History Museum. The program was originally developed by Axcelis, Inc. and coded by Matt Jensen and Ayanna Howard. Evolver was acquired by Palisade Corporation, who continues to upgrade and sell the software to this day. Evolver was originally created by Matthew Jensen.

External links 
 Evolver official page
 Axcelis, Inc. New York Times Article

Genetic algorithms